Admiral Rodney Maclaine Lloyd  (3 July 1841 – 16 May 1911) was a Royal Navy officer who became Admiral Superintendent of Malta Dockyard.

He was the third son, and fifth child, of Edmund and Catherine Elizabeth Lloyd who were living at Fairfield House in Castle Street, Thornbury.

Naval career
Lloyd became Commodore in Charge at Jamaica, with his broad pennant in the troopship HMS Urgent, in September 1889 and, having been promoted to rear admiral on 4 March 1894, he became Admiral Superintendent of Malta Dockyard in February 1897. He was promoted to vice admiral on 10 August 1900, and retired at his own request on 1 September 1902, though was promoted to full admiral on the retired list on 16 June 1904. Lloyd sometimes sat as a nautical assessor with the Judicial Committee of the Privy Council.

References

1841 births
1911 deaths
Companions of the Order of the Bath
Royal Navy admirals